The Locket is a 2002 Hallmark Hall of Fame psychological drama film starring Vanessa Redgrave. The film is a screen adaptation of Richard Paul Evans' novel of the same name, adapted by Karen Arthur, and premiered on December 8, 2002 on CBS Television.

Plot
Esther (Redgrave) is a disillusioned and bitter nursing home resident who shares much with her attendant, Michael (Willett), in terms of personal sacrifices that they have both made. Esther also hides a dark secret. Michael has spent the last several years of his life looking after his cancer-stricken late mother and now faces rejection from his fiancée's father. Michael makes it his mission to improve the last years of Esther's life.

Aided with a locket with her lost love's photograph, Michael searches for the elusive love of Esther's life. But ironically it is Esther that does the greatest favours for Michael. She vouches for him when he's accused of a murder in the nursing home, and helps put him back in contact with his fiancée and estranged father. Just before dying, Esther gives Michael the ring from her past love, hoping he will give it to his fiancée.

Cast
Vanessa Redgrave as Esther Huish
Chad Willett as Michael Keddington
Marguerite Moreau as Faye Murrow
Lori Heuring as Alice Richards
Lourdes Benedicto as Amanda Ibarra
Terry O'Quinn as Casey Keddington
Brock Peters as Henry McCord
Mary McDonnell as Helen Staples

Awards
CAMIE Awards
Character and Morality in Entertainment Award - (won)

Hollywood Makeup Artist and Hair Stylist Guild Awards
Best Hair Styling - Television Mini-Series/Movie of the Week - Steven Mack, Gina Maran (won)

References

External links
 

2002 television films
2002 films
American psychological drama films
2002 biographical drama films
Films based on American novels
Films shot in North Carolina
Hallmark Hall of Fame episodes
Films directed by Karen Arthur
Films scored by Bruce Broughton
2000s English-language films
2000s American films